The men's 10 kilometre classical cross-country skiing competition at the 1992 Winter Olympics in Albertville, France, was held on Thursday 13 February at Les Saisies. Each skier started at half a minute intervals, skiing the entire 10 kilometre course. The Norwegian Terje Langli was the 1991 World champion. Men's 10 kilometre classical was not a part of the 1988 Winter Olympics in Calgary, Canada.

Results
Sources:

References

External links
 Final results (International Ski Federation)

Men's cross-country skiing at the 1992 Winter Olympics
Men's 10 kilometre cross-country skiing at the Winter Olympics